Chah Anjir or Chah-e Anjir or Chahanjir may refer to:
 Chah Anjir, Arsanjan, Fars Province
 Chah-e Anjir, Jahrom, Jahrom County, Fars Province
 Chah Anjir, Mahur, Mamasani County, Fars Province
 Chah Anjir, Mishan, Mamasani County, Fars Province
 Chah Anjir-e Olya, Mamasani, Mamasani County, Fars Province
 Chah Anjir-e Olya, Neyriz, Neyriz County, Fars Province
 Chah Anjir-e Sofla, Neyriz County, Fars Province
 Chah Anjir, Sarvestan, Fars Province
 Chah Anjir, Zarrin Dasht, Fars Province
 Chah Anjir-e Golowrubat, Hormozgan Province
 Chah Anjir, Najafabad, Sirjan County, Kerman Province